Fritz Griesser (17 January 1929 – 19 July 2013) was a Swiss sprinter. He competed in the men's 100 metres at the 1952 Summer Olympics.

References

1929 births
2013 deaths
Athletes (track and field) at the 1952 Summer Olympics
Swiss male sprinters
Olympic athletes of Switzerland
Place of birth missing